The Royal Surrey County Hospital (RSCH) is a 520-bed District General Hospital, located on the fringe of Guildford, run by the Royal Surrey NHS Foundation Trust.

History
The hospital has its origins in a facility at Farnham Road which opened in 1866. The hospital moved to Egerton Road in Guildford in 1979. The new hospital was officially opened by Elizabeth II in February 1981; following the closure of St Luke's Hospital, she returned to open the St Luke's Wing at the Royal Surrey County Hospital in February 1997. A successful campaign to save the Royal Surrey County Hospital from closure was launched in October 2006.

Facilities
It serves a population of 330,000 for general services and up to 2 million for cancer services.  The Royal Surrey is also a specialist centre for diabetes, ENT and maxillo facial surgery. It is situated close to the University of Surrey allowing it to offer opportunities for research and pioneering treatments such as fibroid embolisation, brachytherapy and minimal access surgery.

The Royal Surrey County Hospital was one of the first NHS Trusts in 1991. It treats around 500,000 patients a year – 74,000 Accident and Emergency, 90,000 in-patients and day-patients and 336,000 outpatients.

There are also therapists, scientific and technical and support staff.  The Trust has 20 wards comprising general and specialist surgery, obstetrics, paediatrics, oncology, orthopaedics, general and specialist medicine, intensive care and coronary care, with 527 beds in total. There are 13 dedicated surgical theatres, one obstetric and one minor operations theatre and state of the art outpatient, audiology and rehabilitation departments.

The trust has an aseptics unit which manufactures radiopharmaceuticals and other medication.  It is licensed by the Medicines and Healthcare products Regulatory Agency.  After the agency raised concerns about staffing, quality systems and documentation, production was suspended in November 2019.

Guildford and Waverley Clinical Commissioning Group organised a programme of in-reach GPs in 2015, where GPs were placed in wards of the hospital reviewing patients who had been admitted and advising on possibilities for discharge.

Popular culture
The Royal Surrey County Hospital served as inspiration for the PC game Theme Hospital by local software house Bullfrog.

See also
 List of hospitals in England
 List of NHS trusts

References

External links
The Royal Surrey County Hospital – NHS Trust

Buildings and structures in Guildford
NHS hospitals in England
Hospitals in Surrey
NHS foundation trusts